Gholamhossein Bigdeli,() was born on 15 March 1919 in Dorakhloo (Zanjan).

He was among Soviet Union refugees who was then arrested in suspicion of spying and sentenced to 25 years of exile in Siberia. After eight years and with the death of Joseph Stalin, he was extricated and returned to Baku where he became a well-known literary figure.

Bigdeli returned to Iran in 1979 and acted as counsellor and translator in Cultural Revolution Committee.

He died on 16 August 1998 in Karaj.

References

External links
 Prof. Dr. Gholamhossein Bigdeli in Iran Book News Agency
 Biography of Prof. Dr. GholamHossein Bigdeli, YouTube
 Life of Gholamhossein Bigdeli, YouTube

Azerbaijani-language writers
1919 births
Bigdeli, Gholamhosseinönköö
Azerbaijani emigrants to Iran
Iranian writers
Burials at Emamzadeh Taher
Iranian emigrants to the Soviet Union
Iranian magazine founders